Caroline Abel (born ) is a  Seychellois economist. In 2012, she was appointed Governor of the Central Bank of Seychelles, becoming the first woman in Seychelles to achieve such feat.

Early life and education
Abel was born in Anse Boileau, Mahé, Seychelles, where she completed her basic and secondary education. She is a daughter of Antoine Abel, Seychelles' first playwright. She holds a first degree in Economics and a master's degree in monetary economics from the University of Leeds and the University of Glasgow respectively.

Career
Her career started in April 1994 after she got employed as a senior bank clerk at the Central Bank of Seychelles. She served in several capabilities in the Central Bank of Seychelles before she was appointed deputy governor of the institution in July 2010. On 14 March 2012, Abel became the first woman to be appointed Governor of the Central Bank of Seychelles, succeeding Pierre Laporte.

Publications
 Central Bank Independence in a Small Open Economy: The Case of Seychelles (2009)

Recognitions
During the 6th African Business Leadership Forum and Awards, Abel was awarded a special Commendation Award by Georgia Legislative Black Caucus. She was also presented with the African Female Public Servant of the Year Award by the African Leadership Magazine at the event.

References

1972 births
Living people
People from Anse Boileau
Governors of the Central Bank of Seychelles
Alumni of the University of Leeds
Alumni of the University of Glasgow
Seychellois economists